Siddiq Ismail  (born 10 February 1954 in Karachi, Pakistan) is a Hamd and Na`at reciter and has made appearances for over 50 years on Pakistan Television and Radio Pakistan.

Career
Siddiq Ismail belongs to the Memon community. His parents migrated from India to Pakistan in 1947 after the Partition of India. He started his career at the age of 6 at a local mosque in Old Town, Karachi. He suffered from poliomyelitis at an early age and became physically handicapped. In 1965, he joined Radio Pakistan program Bachon ki Dunya. Since then, he has been selected regularly for Hamd-Naat recitation on various radio and TV shows in Pakistan. 

He has received various awards internationally and nationally and was placed on the list of '500 Influential Muslims'.

"Siddiq Ismail has performed in the presence of presidents, prime ministers, governors, chief ministers and foreign dignitaries."

Some popular naats
Noori Mehfil Pay Chadar Tani Noor Ki
Chamak Tujhse Paatay Hain Sab Paanay Wale
Rendition of "Lamyati Nazeeero" written by Ahmed Raza Khan Barelvi

Awards and recognition
 Sitara-i-Imtiaz in 2013
 Pride of Performance in 1985

References

External links
 , Profile of Siddiq Ismail on hamariweb.com website

 Naats

1954 births
Living people
Memon people
Pakistani performers of Islamic music
People from Karachi
Recipients of the Pride of Performance
Recipients of Sitara-i-Imtiaz
Islamic poetry